Doleshwor Mahadeva is a Hindu Temple of Lord Shiva located in Suryabinayak, south eastern part of Bhaktapur District, Nepal, and is believed to be the head part of Kedarnath temple located in Uttarakhand, India.

History 
For 4000 years people have been searching for the head of the Panch Kedar temples, a bull who was Shiva in reality, who assumed the shape of a bull to avoid the five Pandava brothers, the heroes of the Mahabharat. The legend goes back to the fabled battle of Kurukshetra fought between the five Pandava brothers and their cousins, the 100 Kaurava brothers, which is the pivot of the Mahabharata.
Many folk legends related to the Garhwal region, Lord Shiva and the creation of the Panch Kedar temples are narrated.

A folk legend about Panch Kedar relates to the Pandavas, the heroes of the Hindu epic Mahabharata. The Pandavas defeated and slayed their cousins — the Kauravas in the epic Kurukshetra war. They wished to atone for the sins of committing fratricide (gotra hatya) and Brāhmanahatya (killing of Brahmins — the priest class) during the war. Thus, they handed over the reins of their kingdom to their kin and left in search of lord Shiva and to seek his blessings. First, they went to the holy city of Varanasi (Kashi), believed to be Shiva's favourite city and known for its Kashi Vishwanath Temple. But, Shiva wanted to avoid them as he was deeply incensed by the death and dishonesty at the Kurukshetra war and was, therefore, insensitive to Pandavas' prayers. Therefore, he assumed the form of a bull (Nandi) and hid in the Garhwal region.

Not finding Shiva in Varanasi, the Pandavas went to Garhwal Himalayas. Bhima, the second of the five Pandava brothers, then standing astride two mountains started to look for Shiva. He saw a bull grazing near Guptakashi (“hidden Kashi” — the name derived from the hiding act of Shiva). Bhima immediately recognized the bull to be Shiva. Bhima caught hold of the bull by its tail and hind legs. But the bull-formed Shiva disappeared into the ground to later reappear in parts, with the hump raising in Kedarnath, the arms appearing in Tungnath, the face showing up at Rudranath, the nabhi (navel) and stomach surfacing in Madhyamaheshwar and the hair appearing in Kalpeshwar. The Pandavas pleased with this reappearance in five different forms, built temples at the five places for venerating and worshipping Shiva. The Pandavas were thus freed from their sins. It is also believed that the fore portions of Shiva appeared at Doleshwor Mahadeva Temple, Bhaktapur district Nepal.

A variant of the tale credits Bhima of not only catching the bull, but also stopping it from disappearing. Consequently, the bull was torn asunder into five parts and appeared at five locations in the Kedar Khand of Garhwal region of the Himalayas. After building the Panch Kedar Temples, the Pandavas meditated at Kedarnath for salvation, performed yagna (fire sacrifice) and then through the heavenly path called the Mahapanth (also called Swargarohini), attained heaven or salvation.. The Panch Kedar Temples are constructed in the North-Indian Himalayan Temple architecture with the Kedarnath, Tungnath and Madhyamaheshwar temples looking similar.

After completing the pilgrimage of Lord Shiva's darshan at the Panch Kedar Temples, it is an unwritten religious rite to visit Lord Vishnu at the Badrinath Temple, as a final affirmatory proof by the devotee that he has sought blessings of Lord Shiva.

Research and findings 
The Hindu activist Bharat Jangam had been researching and claiming that Doleshwar Mahadev is the head part of Kedarnath based on the surprising links between Kedarnath and Doleshwor. The Sculptures of Shive found in both shrines are 4,000 years old. Even a stone scripture found in Doleshwor was written in Sanskrit and Old Nepalese. The priests in both shrines are selected from India's southern states of Karnataka, Andhra Pradesh, Kerala and Tamil Nadu. Both priests affix the word ‘ling’ after their names to convey their proximity to the god as his worshipper and both temples have a cluster of five Shiva shrines. The main deity of both priests is Birbhadra, a companion of Shiva, according to Hindu scriptures.

Recognition 
On August 22, 2009 the head priest of Kedarnath peeth Shree 1008 Jagat Guru Bheemashankarling Shivacharya unveiled the plaque claiming that Doleswore Mahadev, located in Jangam math Bhaktapur, is the head part of Shri Kedarnath. He performed Rudra Abhishek, a special worshipping at the Doleshwor temple situated in Sipadol village of Bhaktapur district. This is also mentioned in the inscription (Sheela Lekh) at Doleshwar Mahadev. Thousands of devotees have been thronging in the Doleswor Mahadev Temple.

References

External links 
 http://doleswormahadev.wordpress.com/2009/10/23/hello-world/

Hindu temples in Bagmati Province
Buildings and structures in Bhaktapur District